James Elms Swett (June 15, 1920 – January 18, 2009) was a United States Marine Corps fighter pilot and flying ace during World War II. He was awarded the United States' highest military decoration, the Medal of Honor, for actions while a division flight leader in VMF-221 over Guadalcanal on April 7, 1943. He downed a total of 15.5 enemy aircraft during the war, earning two Distinguished Flying Crosses and five Air Medals.

Early life
Born on June 15, 1920 in Seattle, Washington, James E. Swett graduated from San Mateo High School, San Mateo, California, and enrolled at the College of San Mateo in 1939. He earned a private pilot's license, which amounted to 450 more hours of flying than he received during his Navy flight training. He enlisted in the U.S. Naval Reserve as a seaman second class on August 26, 1941, and started flight training in September.

Military career

Service in World War II

Swett completed flight training in early 1942, placing in the top ten percent of his class. He was given the option to choose between a commission in the Marine Corps or the Navy, and he chose the Marine Corps. He was commissioned as a second lieutenant at NAS Corpus Christi, Texas, on April 1, 1942. In December 1942, he shipped out to the Southwest Pacific, and when he arrived at Guadalcanal he was assigned to VMF-221, which was part of Marine Air Group 12.

Medal of Honor action

On April 7, 1943, on his first combat mission, Swett both became an ace and acted with such "conspicuous gallantry and intrepidity at the risk of his life above and beyond the call of duty" that he was awarded the Medal of Honor.

His first mission was as a division leader on a combat air patrol over the Russell Islands early on the morning of April 7 in expectation of a large Japanese air attack. Landing to refuel, the four-plane division of Grumman F4F Wildcats he was leading was scrambled after other aircraft reported 150 planes approaching Ironbottom Sound, and intercepted a large formation of Japanese Aichi D3A dive bombers (Allied code name: "Val") attacking Tulagi harbor.

When the fight became a general melee, Swett pursued three Aichi D3A Vals diving on the harbor. After he had downed two, and while he was evading fire from the rear gunner of the third, the left wing of his F4F Wildcat was holed by U.S. antiaircraft fire. Despite this, he downed the third Val and turned toward a second formation of six Vals leaving the area.

Swett repeatedly attacked the line of dive bombers, downing each in turn with short bursts. He brought down four and was attacking a fifth when his ammunition was depleted and his cockpit was shot up by return fire. Wounded, he decided to ditch his damaged fighter off the coast of Florida Island, after it became clear that his oil cooler had been hit and he would not make it back to base. After a few seconds his engine seized, and despite initially being trapped in his cockpit underwater, Swett extricated himself and was rescued in Tulagi harbor after ditching his plane. This feat made the 22-year-old Marine aviator an ace on his first combat mission.

Further combat service
Swett returned to Guadalcanal after a short stay in a Naval hospital and learned that Admiral Marc Mitscher had nominated him for the Medal of Honor. After a short rest in Australia, Swett checked out in the Vought F4U Corsair to which VMF-221 was converting and moved to a new base in the Russells. Promoted to captain, Swett covered the Rendova landings on June 30, 1943, adding two Mitsubishi G4M "Betty" medium bombers to his score and sharing the downing of a Mitsubishi A6M Zero.

Eleven days later, near the island of New Georgia, Swett downed two more Bettys. Seeing his wingman's Corsair under attack, he also shot down a Zero. However, he failed to see a second Zero and was himself shot down. He was rescued by indigenous tribal members in a canoe and traveled by ten-man canoe for several hours to an Australian coast watcher's location. A PBY flying boat returned Swett to the Russells. In October 1943, over the major Japanese airbase at Kahili, Bougainville, Swett added one confirmed Zero and one probable, but lost his wingman. In November, he added to his list of kills 2 more Vals and a possible Kawasaki Ki-61 Tony, a new Japanese fighter.

On December 11, Swett returned to the United States on a Dutch motor ship, arriving in San Francisco on New Year's Eve. After less than 24 hours, he shipped out to San Diego, where he was granted 30-days leave and married Lois Anderson, his longtime sweetheart. Swett was then transferred to NAS Santa Barbara, California, where he worked up a newly manned VMF 221 in the Corsair.

On May 11, 1945, he shot down a Yokosuka D4Y Judy kamikaze, which he described as a "sitting duck". Swett watched from the air as the Bunker Hill was struck by two kamikazes, causing such damage that he was forced to land on another carrier.

Swett later returned to the States and was assigned to MCAS El Toro, California, where he began to train for Operation Olympic, the invasion of Japan. At war's end, VMF 221 was second in aerial victories among Marine Corps squadrons with 185 enemy planes downed. Swett's combat record includes 103 combat missions, 15.5 confirmed victories and four probables. He earned the Purple Heart, two Distinguished Flying Crosses, and the Medal of Honor.

Post-war service
After returning to the U.S. he served with VMF-221 at MCAS El Toro, California.

Swett commanded VMF-141 flying Corsairs at NAS Alameda, California, following the end of World War II. After the onset of the Korean War his squadron was deployed to Korea, but he was left behind because the Navy thought putting a Medal of Honor recipient in combat was too risky. Swett left active duty and continued service in the Marine Corps Reserve, retiring in 1970 in the rank of colonel.

Post-military life
Swett was married to Lois Anderson from January 20, 1944 till her death on December 5, 1999. They had two sons, James Jr. and John, both of whom went on to become Marine Corps officers. Swett later remarried to Verna Gale McPherson Miller in 2007.

Swett worked in his father's company in San Francisco, making marine pumps and turbines. In 1960, after his father's death, Swett took over the company and ran it for 23 years, before passing it on to his son. Swett moved to Trinity Center, California in his retirement and became a frequent speaker at schools, where he shared his strong feelings about the values of respect and responsibility. He owned 13 Porsche cars during his lifetime.

In 2006, Swett's Medal of Honor action was recreated using computer graphics for The History Channel series Dogfights in episode Guadalcanal and Swett himself provided commentary. The episode first aired on November 24, 2006.

Swett moved to Redding, California in 2007 where he died on January 18, 2009, in a Redding hospital from heart failure after a lengthy illness. He was buried with full military honors at Northern California Veterans Cemetery in Igo, California.

The airport in Trinity Center, California was named in his honor.

Awards and decorations
His awards and decorations include:

Medal of Honor citation

See also
List of Medal of Honor recipients
George C. Axtell
Jefferson J. DeBlanc
Archie G. Donahue
Jeremiah J. O'Keefe

References
Inline

General

Further reading
Mersky, Commander Peter B. Time of the Aces: Marine Pilots in the Solomons, 1942–1944, Marines in World War II Commemorative Series, History and Museums Division, United States Marine Corps, 1993

External links

1920 births
2009 deaths
American World War II flying aces
Aviators from Washington (state)
Battle of Iwo Jima
United States Marine Corps Medal of Honor recipients
Military personnel from Seattle
Recipients of the Distinguished Flying Cross (United States)
United States Marine Corps colonels
United States Marine Corps pilots of World War II
United States Naval Aviators
World War II recipients of the Medal of Honor
United States Navy reservists
Recipients of the Air Medal